Ian Kenneth Gibbons (born 8 February 1970) is an English former footballer who played in the Football League for Stoke City.

Career
Gibbons was born in Stoke-on-Trent and played in the youth team of local club Stoke City. With Stoke's 1987–88 campaign coming to a close with nothing to play for manager Mick Mills decided to give youth team players some first team experience and Gibbons made his debut a substitute in a 1–1 draw at home to Crystal Palace on 4 April 1988. He never made it as a professional footballer and later went on to play for non-league Hilberry and Newcastle Town.

Career statistics

References

English footballers
Stoke City F.C. players
Newcastle Town F.C. players
English Football League players
1970 births
Living people
Association football forwards